Reading Minster was an English association football club based in Reading.  It is unclear when the club was founded, but it was playing football at least by the 1878-79 season.

History

The club first entered the FA Cup in 1880-81.  In the first round, the club drew 1-1 with Romford at a neutral ground in Ealing.  The club scratched from the competition before the replay could take place.

The club's best run in the competition was in the following season.  The club beat Windsor Home Park at home in controversial circumstances; the Reading Observer reporting that Minster had won 1-0, with a disputed goal against which Home Park had made a protest, and the Windsor newspapers reporting the score as being 0-0.  The Football Association rejected the protest.

In the second round, Minster beat Romford, again in controversial circumstances; Minster took the lead when Romford stopped playing, because of an apparent offside, and late in the match, when Earle of Romford was brought down, "a foul was claimed for this, and being allowed by one of the umpires,one of the Romford men picked up the ball for the purpose of passing it back to where the foul took place, but the referee gave “hands” to the home team."  Romford considered a protest but did not file one.

In the third round, the club played the Hotspur club of Battersea, who had beaten Reading Abbey in the second round, but lost in a replay.

The club entered the FA Cup until 1884-85, albeit the club scratched in 1882-83 having been given a walkover in round 1, and the club's worst performance came in a 10-1 defeat to the Old Carthusians in 1883, played for the occasion in the grounds of Park House in Reading, owned by Reading F.C. member A.C. Bartholomew. 

The club was always in the shadow of other local clubs, such as Reading and South Reading F.C. and it never reached the final of the local FA's competition.  The final recorded match of the club was a 6-2 defeat at Maidenhead United F.C. in December 1895.

References

Association football clubs established in the 19th century
Football clubs in Reading
Defunct football clubs in England
Defunct football clubs in Berkshire
Association football clubs disestablished in the 19th century